Zsuzsanna is the Hungarian form of the feminine given name Susanna.

Notable bearers
Zsuzsanna Budapest (born 1940), American author of Hungarian origin who writes on feminist spirituality
Zsuzsanna Csobánki (born 1983), female Hungarian swimmer, who competed for her native country at the 2004 Summer Olympics in Athens, Greece
Zsuzsanna Gulácsi (born 1966), Hungarian historian specialising in Manichaean art
Zsuzsanna Jakab (born 1951), director of the World Health Organization's Regional Office for Europe in Copenhagen, Denmark
Zsuzsanna Jakabos (born 1989), Hungarian swimmer, who twice competed for her native country at the Summer Olympics: 2004 and 2008
Zsuzsanna Kézi (born 1945), former Hungarian handball player who competed in the 1976 Summer Olympics
Zsuzsanna Krajnyák (born 1978), Hungarian Paralympic wheelchair fencer
Zsuzsanna Laky (born 1984), former beauty contestant and Miss Europe 2003
Zsuzsanna Lorántffy (born 1602), the wife of György Rákóczi I, prince of Transylvania
Zsuzsanna Lovász-Pavlik (born 1976), Hungarian handball player
Zsuzsanna Nagy (born 1986), Hungarian ice dancer
Zsuzsanna Pálffy (born 1970), Hungarian handball player
Zsuzsanna Sirokay (born 1941), Hungarian pianist and lives in Switzerland
Zsuzsanna Szőcs (born 1962), Hungarian fencer, who won two Olympic medals in the foil team competitions
Zsuzsanna Szabó-Olgyai (born 1973), retired pole vaulter from Hungary, who represented her native country at the 2000 Summer Olympics in Sydney
Zsuzsanna Veress (born 1976), Hungarian handball goalkeeper
Zsuzsanna Vörös (born 1977), Hungarian modern pentathlete who won a gold medal at the 2004 Summer Olympics in Athens, Greece
ZZ Ward, (born 1986), born Zsuzsanna Eva Ward, American singer-songwriter

Hungarian feminine given names

no:Zsuzsanna